Nifty Magazine is a high fashion magazine that focuses on upcoming and aspiring models, fashion, beauty and health. It was first published in May 2007. The magazine is headquartered in New York City. It is published on monthly basis.

Content
NIFTY Magazine's mission is to highlight the hidden information pertaining to the model industry, to show the realism of a model's profession.

Past cover models

Top recognizable models

See also
 List of fashion magazines

References

Monthly magazines published in the United States
Women's magazines published in the United States
Magazines established in 2007
Magazines published in New York City
Women's fashion magazines